Toomas Leius (born 28 August 1941) is a former tennis player from Estonia who competed for the Soviet Union.

Career
Leius was the boys' singles champion at the 1959 Wimbledon Championships. He won the Soviet Championships in 1963, 1964, 1965 and 1968. Other good performances during his career include reaching the final of the 1964 Queen's Club Championships, which he lost to Roy Emerson, and taking Rod Laver to five sets at the 1969 Heineken Open. He was a gold medalist in the mixed doubles at the 1970 Summer Universiade in Turin, with Tiiu Parmas.

His best performance in the singles draw of a Grand Slam tournament came at the 1965 French Championships, where he made the quarter-finals. He was due to face South African player Cliff Drysdale in the quarter-final but the Soviet delegation made him forfeit the match, in protest against apartheid. Leius and Winnie Shaw were mixed doubles runners-up at the 1971 French Open.

He was a regular fixture in the Soviet Davis Cup team during the 1960s and appeared in a total of 20 ties, from which he managed 23 wins, 17 of them in singles.

Murder conviction and prison
On 13 May 1974, Toomas Leius strangled his wife Ene Leius (née Visnapuu) to death after finding her in bed with another man. He was sentenced to eight years in prison and was released after serving five years for good behavior.

Coaching
Leius worked as a tennis coach after leaving prison and spent some time as captain of the Estonia Fed Cup team.

Grand Slam finals

Mixed doubles: 1 (0–1)

Awards
Estonian Sportspersonality of the year: 1961, 1963, 1965

References

External links
 
 
 

1941 births
Living people
Estonian male tennis players
Sportspeople from Tallinn
Soviet male tennis players
Universiade medalists in tennis
Estonian people convicted of murder
Murder in Estonia
Soviet people convicted of murder
People convicted of murder by Estonia
People convicted of murder by the Soviet Union
Uxoricides
Tallinn University alumni
Universiade gold medalists for the Soviet Union
Universiade silver medalists for the Soviet Union
Grand Slam (tennis) champions in boys' singles
Wimbledon junior champions
Medalists at the 1965 Summer Universiade
Medalists at the 1970 Summer Universiade